This is a list of the 2013 Super League season results. Super League is the top-flight rugby league competition in the United Kingdom and France. The 2013 season starts on 1 February and ends on 5 October with the 2013 Super League Grand Final at Old Trafford. The Magic Weekend was scheduled over the weekend of 25 and 26 May and would be played at the Etihad Stadium in Manchester for the second time, the ground having been used for the 2012 season.

The 2013 Super League season consists of two stages. The regular season is played over 27 round-robin fixtures, in which each of the fourteen teams involved in the competition played each other once at home and once away, as well as their Magic Weekend fixtures played over the sixteenth round of the season. In Super League XVIII, a win was worth two points in the table, a draw worth one point apiece, and a loss yielded no points.

The league leaders at the end of the regular season, will receive the League Leaders' Shield, but the Championship will be decided through the second stage of the season—the play-offs. The top eight teams in the table contest to play in the 2013 Super League Grand Final, the winners of which will be crowned Super League XVIII Champions.

Regular season

Round 1

Round 2

Round 3

Round 4

Round 5

Round 6

Round 7

Round 8

Round 9

Round 10

Round 11

Round 12

Round 13

Round 14

Round 15

Round 16 - Magic Weekend

Round 17

Round 18

Round 19

Round 20

Round 21

Round 22

Round 23

Round 24

Round 25

Round 26

Round 27

Play-offs
The 2013 Super League play-offs will take place during September and October 2013 and consists of the top eight teams of the regular season.

Format

Super League has used a play-off system since Super League III in 1998. When introduced, 5 teams qualified for the play-offs, which was subsequently expanded to 6 teams in 2002. The 2013 season will follow the same format that has been used since the 2009 season, which consists of an 8-team play-off.

The winning team from week one with the highest league placing will be allowed to select their opponents for week three in the Club Call.
Except for the Club-Call, the current play-off format follows the play-off system of the Australian Football League.

Week 1

Week 2

Week 3

Week 4

Notes
A. Game re-scheduled from 8 February due to accident on M62 motorway 
B. Game re-schuduled from 17 February due to Huddersfield Town's FA Cup 5th Round tie with Wigan Athletic 
C. Game re-schuduled from 24 February due to Bradford City FC's involvement in the 2013 Football League Cup Final  
D. Game re-scheduled to 17 June 2013 due to Leeds Rhinos' involvement in the 2013 World Club Challenge
E. Game postponed on 22 March and 24 March due to snow
F. Game move to Esher RFC due to pitch at Twickenham Stoop being unplayable
G. Game abandoned after 73 minutes due to floodlight issues. Result needs to be ratified by Rugby Football League
H. Game move to Adams Park due to Harlequins's Heineken Cup quarter-final match against Munster on 7 April
I. All matches played at Etihad Stadium as part of Magic Weekend
J. Ground renamed from Stobart Stadium to Select Security Stadium from June 2013
K. Game moved to Gillingham F.C.'s Priestfield Stadium

See also
Super League XVIII
Super League play-offs

References

External links
engage Super League website
Rugby League Project
2013 Super League season results

Results
Super League
Super League
Super League